The 5th CC.NN. Division "1 Febbraio" was an Italian CC.NN. (Blackshirts militia) division raised on 15 July 1935 for the Second Italo-Ethiopian War against Ethiopia and disbanded shortly after the war. The name "1 Febbraio" was chosen to commemorate the founding of the Milizia Volontaria per la Sicurezza Nazionale on 1 February 1923.

Organization 
Below follows the division's organization during the Second Italo-Ethiopian War and the cities, in which its CC.NN. battalions and companies/batteries were raised.

 5th CC.NN. Division "1 Febbraio"
 107th CC.NN. Legion "Cairoli", in Pavia
 Command Company
 CVII CC.NN. Battalion, in Pavia
 CLXXXVI CC.NN. Battalion, in Lucca
 107th CC.NN. Machine Gun Company, in Pavia
 107th CC.NN. Artillery Battery, in Pavia (65/17 infantry support guns)
 128th CC.NN. Legion "Randaccio", in Vercelli
 Command Company
 CXXVIII CC.NN. Battalion, in Vercelli
 CXXIX CC.NN. Battalion, in Arona
 128th CC.NN. Machine Gun Company, in Vercelli
 128th CC.NN. Artillery Battery, in Vercelli (65/17 infantry support guns)
 142nd CC.NN. Legion "Berica", in Vicenza
 Command Company
 CXLII CC.NN. Battalion, in Vicenza
 CCXLII CC.NN. Battalion, in Vicenza
 142nd CC.NN. Machine Gun Company, in Vicenza
 142nd CC.NN. Artillery Battery, in Vicenza (65/17 infantry support guns)
 V CC.NN. Machine Gun Battalion
 V Artillery Group (65/17 infantry support guns, Royal Italian Army)
 V Mixed Transport Unit (Royal Italian Army)
 V Supply Unit (Royal Italian Army)
 2x CC.NN. replacement battalions
 5th Special Engineer Company (Royal Italian Army)
 5th Medical Section (Royal Italian Army)
 5th Logistic Section (Royal Italian Army)
 5th Carabinieri Section

The supply unit had 1,600 mules and the mixed transport unit 80 light trucks. The division engaged in war crimes in Ethiopia during the Second Italo-Ethiopian War.

Sources 
 Ettore Lucas and Giorgio de Vecchi, "Storia delle Unità Combattenti della MVSN 1923-1943", Giovanni Volpe Editore, 1976. pages 63 to 116 plus errata.

References 

Divisions of Italy of the Second Italo-Ethiopian War
Blackshirt divisions of Italy